Ctenomeristis vojnitsi is a species of snout moth in the genus Ctenomeristis. It was described by Roesler, in 1983, and is known from Indonesia (Sumatra).

References

Moths described in 1983
Phycitini